Ilgonis is a Latvian male given name. The name day of persons named Ilgonis is September 27.

References 

Masculine given names
Latvian masculine given names